The Ohio Department of Education (ODE) is the administrative department of the Ohio state government responsible for primary and secondary public education in the state. The Ohio State Board of Education is the governing body of the department and is responsible for overseeing the department. The board employs the Superintendent of Public Instruction, who runs the department. The department is headquartered in Columbus.

The department is responsible for implementing standardized tests required by state and federal law, including the Ohio Achievement Test (OAT), Ohio Graduation Test (OGT), and the Ohio English Language Proficiency Assessment (OELPA, formerly OTELA). The State Board of Education does not have jurisdiction over higher education; Ohio's public colleges and universities are governed as part of the University System of Ohio by the Ohio Board of Regents and by the boards of trustees of each institution.

State Board of Education
The Board of Education consists of 19 members. All serve four-year terms.

Eleven of these are elected from 11 single-member districts, which are formed by combining three contiguous Ohio Senate districts. The governor appoints eight members. All serve four year terms. The elected members' terms are staggered so that half of the board is elected in each even-numbered year. Vacancies in the elected membership are filled by appointment by the governor. The chairman of the Ohio House of Representatives Education Committee and his or her counterpart in the Ohio State Senate are ex officio members.

The chairs of the Ohio House of Representatives and Ohio Senate education committees are ex officio non-voting members of the board. The board is responsible for choosing a Superintendent of Public Instruction, who manages the day-to-day affairs of the Department of Education.

References

External links
Official website
Ballotpedia Page

Education
Public education in Ohio
State departments of education of the United States
1834 establishments in Ohio
Broad Street (Columbus, Ohio)